CBC Drama '73 is a Canadian drama anthology television miniseries which aired on CBC Television in 1973.

Premise
This series of Canadian dramas included adaptations of novels.

Scheduling
This hour-long series was broadcast on Sundays at 9:00 p.m. (Eastern) from 30 September to 2 December 1973.

Episodes
Dramas featured in this series included:

Awards
Burroughs' performance in Vicky won both ACTRA's Earle Grey Award for best television performance at the 3rd ACTRA Awards, and the Canadian Film Award for Best Actress in a Non-Feature at the 25th Canadian Film Awards, and Woods won the ACTRA Award for Best Writing in a Television Drama.

Leblanc and Vernon were both also nominated for the Earle Grey Award, and Charles Israel was nominated for Best Writing in Television Drama, at the ACTRA Awards.

References

External links
 

CBC Television original programming
1970s Canadian drama television series
1973 Canadian television series debuts
1973 Canadian television series endings